Hyperstrotia is a genus of moths of the family Erebidae. The genus was erected by George Hampson in 1910.

Taxonomy
The genus has previously been classified in the subfamily Phytometrinae within Erebidae or in the subfamily Acontiinae of the family Noctuidae.

Species
 Hyperstrotia aetheria Grote, 1879
 Hyperstrotia albida Hampson, 1910
 Hyperstrotia flaviguttata Grote, 1882 – yellow-spotted graylet moth
 Hyperstrotia flavipuncta Leech, 1889
 Hyperstrotia inordinata Walker, [1863]
 Hyperstrotia macroplaga Hampson, 1907
 Hyperstrotia meeki Bethune-Baker, 1906
 Hyperstrotia molybdota Hampson, 1910
 Hyperstrotia nana Hübner, 1818
 Hyperstrotia ochreipuncta Wileman, 1914
 Hyperstrotia oletta Schaus, 1904
 Hyperstrotia pervertens (Barnes & McDunnough, 1918) – dotted graylet moth
 Hyperstrotia secta Grote, 1879 – black-patched graylet moth
 Hyperstrotia semiochrea Hampson, 1898
 Hyperstrotia variata Wileman & West, 1929
 Hyperstrotia villificans Barnes & McDunnough, 1918 – white-lined graylet moth

References

Boletobiinae
Noctuoidea genera